Rajgurunagar (Khed) is a census town in the Pune Metropolitan Region of the  Indian state of Maharashtra. It is situated on the bank of river Bhima and Pune-Nasik National Highway It is the headquarters of Khed taluka in the Pune district.

Etymology
The town was known by the name Khed in the past. In the 1960s the name was changed to Rajgurunagar in honour of Indian freedom fighter, Shivaram Rajguru, who was born there.

Demographics 
As per 2011 census, Rajgurunagar has population of 25,146 of which 12,899 were males while 12,247 were females.
Average Sex Ratio of city is 949 which is higher than Maharashtra state average of 929.
Literacy rate of city was 91% compared to 82.95% of Maharashtra. Male literacy rate was 93% while female literacy rate was 88%.
Scheduled Castes constitutes 6.2% of total population while Scheduled Tribes were 5%.

Government and Politics

Economy
Bharat Forge's Special Economic Zone (SEZ) named as Khed City is the biggest SEZ in Pune spread over 1,000 hectares (4200Acre) of notified land in Khed taluka.

MARS International India Pvt.Ltd., the global manufacturer of chocolates, snack foods and pet foods acquired a large parcel of land in KhedCity (Bharat Forge's SEZ). The Company will set up its first manufacturing facility in India here with investment of Rs 1,005 crore (over $160 million).

See also
 Gosasi
 Talukas in Pune district
 Khed taluka
 Amboli, Pune
 Kude Bk, Pune 
 New Pune International Airport

References 

Cities and towns in Pune district